Home Economics is an American television sitcom created by Michael Colton and John Aboud that premiered on ABC on April 7, 2021, as a midseason entry in the 2020–21 television season. In May 2021, the series was renewed for a second season which premiered on September 22, 2021. In May 2022, the series was renewed for a third season which premiered on September 21, 2022.

Premise
Home Economics follows the lives of three siblings. Tom, the oldest, his wife Marina, and their three children are considered a middle class family. The middle sibling, Sarah, her wife Denise, and their two adopted children live in a tiny apartment and are barely scraping by on their meager incomes. The youngest, Connor, is very well off financially but unlucky in love, as the series begins with him finalizing a divorce.

Cast and characters

Main

 Topher Grace as Tom, a middle-class author who is struggling. He is the oldest of the three siblings, and is married to Marina.
 Caitlin McGee as Sarah, the middle sibling, a child therapist who is barely making ends meet. She is married to Denise and has two adopted kids.
 Jimmy Tatro as Connor, the youngest sibling, who runs his own private equity firm and is very well off. He is getting divorced and has a daughter, Gretchen.
 Karla Souza as Marina, a former lawyer who is Tom's wife, now raising their three children as a stay-at-home mom. Souza described her character as "very blunt and just speaks her mind" and went on to say about Marina's relationship with Sarah's wife Denise that "Sasheer and I also have great chemistry and they definitely wrote to that. It's a pair developed throughout the season."
 Sasheer Zamata as Denise, a teacher who is Sarah's wife
 Shiloh Bearman as Gretchen, Connor's daughter
 Jordyn Curet as Shamiah, Sarah's and Denise's daughter
 JeCobi Swain as Kelvin, Sarah's and Denise's son
 Chloe Jo Rountree as Camila, Tom's and Marina's daughter
 Lidia Porto as Lupe (season 2–present; recurring season 1), Connor's housekeeper

Recurring 

 Nora Dunn as Muriel, Tom, Sarah, and Connor's mother
 Phil Reeves as Marshall, Tom, Sarah, and Connor's father
 Tetona Jackson as Jojo (season 2), Denise's sister and Connor's new love interest
 Marc-Sully Saint-Fleur as Mr. Zarrow (season 2), a co-worker of Sarah's

Guest stars
 Dustin Ybarra as Spags (seasons 1-2), a family friend of the Hayworths ("Mermaid Taffeta Wedding Dress, $1,999", "Poker Game, $800 Buy-In")
 Justine Lupe as Emily (seasons 1-2), Connor's ex-wife and Gretchen's mother ("The Triangle Shirtwaist Fire: An Oral History (Used), $11", "Box of King-Size Candy Bars, $48.99", "Pregnancy Test, $12.98")
 Nicole Byer as Amanda (seasons 1-2), a book editor who wants to publish Tom's book ("Opus Cabernet, 2015, $500", "Chorizo with Mojo Verde and Chicharrón, $45", "Men's Water-Resistant Watch, $289")
 Ray Wise as Frank (season 2), Connor's client who has a San Francisco 49ers suite ("49ers Foam Fingers, $7")
 Jerry Rice as himself (season 2) ("49ers Foam Fingers, $7")
 Scott Van Pelt as himself (season 2) ("49ers Foam Fingers, $7")
 24kGoldn as himself (season 2) ("49ers Foam Fingers, $7")
 Roselyn Sánchez as Sofía (season 2), a famous chef that Tom is ghostwriting for ("Chorizo with Mojo Verde and Chicharrón, $45", "Speeding Ticket, $180", "Men's Water-Resistant Watch, $289")
 Danica McKellar as Alison (season 2), the principal of Windmount Academy ("Windmount Academy, $42,000/Year", "FaceFlop App, $1.99")
 Cheech Marin as Roberto (season 2), Marina's father ("Round Trip Ticket SAN-OAK, $234", "Wedding Bouquet, $125")
 Mark Cuban as himself (season 2),  Spags' friend ("Poker Game, $800 Buy-In")
 Yvette Nicole Brown as Donna (season 3) ("Mickey Ears, $19.99")
 Tyler "Ninja" Blevins as Ninja (season 3) ("Melatonin 10 Mg Tablets, $14.99")
 Kelly Ripa as herself (season 3) ("Live with Kelly and Ryan Hoodie, Complimentary")
 Ryan Seacrest as himself (season 3) ("Live with Kelly and Ryan Hoodie, Complimentary")
 Casey Wilson as Harmony (season 3), Tom's #1 fan of his published novel later revealed to be Tom, Sarah, and Connor's paternal half-sister("Novel Signed by Author, $22.19", "Wheel of Vegan Brie, $24")
 Kim Coles as Tamara (season 3), Denise's mother ("Sunday New York Times, $6")
 Gary Anthony Williams as Jay (season 3), Denise's father ("Sunday New York Times, $6")
 Eddie Cibrian as Santiago (season 3) ("Sunday New York Times, $6", "Gallon of Milk, $4.35", "Limited Edition Boom Boom Dojo JollyBot, $45.99")

Episodes

Series overview

Season 1 (2021)

Season 2 (2021–22)

Season 3 (2022–23)

Production

Development
On October 25, 2018, it was announced that Fox had put the project in development with a script commitment and a penalty attached. On February 13, 2020, ABC gave the production a pilot order. The pilot was written by Michael Colton and John Aboud. On December 8, 2020, ABC picked up Home Economics to series. It was created by Colton and Aboud, who are expected to executive produce alongside Topher Grace, Eric Tannenbaum, and Kim Tannenbaum. On May 14, 2021, ABC renewed the series for a second season. On October 26, 2021, the second season received a back-order of nine episodes. On May 13, 2022, ABC renewed the series for a third season.

Casting
On February 14, 2020, Grace was cast to headline Home Economics. On July 16, 2020, Caitlin McGee, Karla Souza, and Sasheer Zamata joined the main cast. Upon the series order announcement, Jimmy Tatro, Shiloh Bearman, Jordyn Starr Curet, Chloe Jo Rountree, and JeCobi Swain were cast in undisclosed starring roles. Nicole Byer plays Tom's editor Amanda in the season's final episode. After the finale, star Topher Grace expressed excitement that the character might return in the second season in a more prominent role. On August 26, 2021, it was reported that Danica McKellar was cast to guest star in an episode that aired on October 13, 2021.

Filming
The series began filming on February 1, 2021, in Los Angeles, California.

Broadcast
The first season of Home Economics premiered on April 7, 2021 and concluded on May 19, 2021 on ABC. The second season premiered on September 22, 2021. The third season premiered on September 21, 2022.

In Canada, the first two seasons were aired on CTV began simulcasting the series alongside the US broadcast, it moved to Global starting with the 3rd season.

Reception

Critical response
On Rotten Tomatoes, the series holds an approval rating of 82% based on 11 critic reviews, with an average rating of 7/10. The website's critical consensus reads, "Not all of Home Economics calculations add up, but believable chemistry between its well-cast siblings and a real sense of affection equals a lot of potential for positive growth." On Metacritic, it has a weighted average score of 64 out of 100 based on 6 critic reviews, indicating "generally favorable reviews".

Dave Nemetz of TVLine  gave the series a B and called it "a breezy watch with a casually zany hangout energy, and it hits on some touchy subjects without getting too deep with them ... It's tough to talk about money sometimes, but the Home Economics crew finds a way to make it almost fun." In a review, Joel Keller of Decider said "The income disparities among the three siblings are a good way into the show, as a way to define and differentiate them. But what's going to carry the show is having them more fleshed out as characters and the squabbling but loving relationship they have with each other. Yes, it's funny when they all chase each other down the street in some of the fleet of miniature cars Connor bought for his daughter. But jokes about their relative net worths really won't take the show very far." Daniel D'Addario of Variety praised the show's style and tone, saying "It's early days for a show with a fair amount on its mind and a good sense of who its three leads are. It's worth hoping that the show pursues the instinct that led to develop three sharply observed characters, and refines those parts of the show that are not there yet."

Ratings

Overall

Season 1

Season 2

Season 3

Notes

References

External links
 
 

2020s American single-camera sitcoms
2021 American television series debuts
American Broadcasting Company original programming
English-language television shows
Mass media portrayals of the middle class
Television series about families
Television series about siblings
Television series by ABC Studios
Television series by Lionsgate Television
Television shows filmed in Los Angeles
Television shows set in the San Francisco Bay Area
American LGBT-related sitcoms
 Television shows set in California